Marine biology is the scientific study of the biology of marine life, organisms in the sea.  Given that in biology many phyla, families and genera have some species that live in the sea and others that live on land, marine biology classifies species based on the environment rather than on taxonomy.

A large proportion of all life on Earth lives in the ocean. The exact size of this large proportion is unknown, since many ocean species are still to be discovered. The ocean is a complex three-dimensional world covering approximately 71% of the Earth's surface. The habitats studied in marine biology include everything from the tiny layers of surface water in which organisms and abiotic items may be trapped in surface tension between the ocean and atmosphere, to the depths of the oceanic trenches, sometimes 10,000 meters or more beneath the surface of the ocean. Specific habitats include estuaries, coral reefs, kelp forests, seagrass meadows, the surrounds of seamounts and thermal vents, tidepools, muddy, sandy and rocky bottoms, and the open ocean (pelagic) zone, where solid objects are rare and the surface of the water is the only visible boundary. The organisms studied range from microscopic phytoplankton and zooplankton to huge cetaceans (whales)  in length. Marine ecology is the study of how marine organisms interact with each other and the environment.

Marine life is a vast resource, providing food, medicine, and raw materials, in addition to helping to support recreation and tourism all over the world. At a fundamental level, marine life helps determine the very nature of our planet. Marine organisms contribute significantly to the oxygen cycle, and are involved in the regulation of the Earth's climate. Shorelines are in part shaped and protected by marine life, and some marine organisms even help create new land.

Many species are economically important to humans, including both finfish and shellfish. It is also becoming understood that the well-being of marine organisms and other organisms are linked in fundamental ways. The human body of knowledge regarding the relationship between life in the sea and important cycles is rapidly growing, with new discoveries being made nearly every day. These cycles include those of matter (such as the carbon cycle) and of air (such as Earth's respiration, and movement of energy through ecosystems including the ocean). Large areas beneath the ocean surface still remain effectively unexplored.

Biological oceanography 

Marine biology can be contrasted with biological oceanography. Marine life is a field of study both in marine biology and in biological oceanography. Biological oceanography is the study of how organisms affect and are affected by the physics, chemistry, and geology of the oceanographic system. Biological oceanography mostly focuses on the microorganisms within the ocean; looking at how they are affected by their environment and how that affects larger marine creatures and their ecosystem. Biological oceanography is similar to marine biology, but it studies ocean life from a different perspective. Biological oceanography takes a bottom up approach in terms of the food web, while marine biology studies the ocean from a top down perspective. Biological oceanography mainly focuses on the ecosystem of the ocean with an emphasis on plankton: their diversity (morphology, nutritional sources, motility, and metabolism); their productivity and how that plays a role in the global carbon cycle; and their distribution (predation and life cycle). Biological oceanography also investigates the role of microbes in food webs, and how humans impact the ecosystems in the oceans.

Marine habitats

Marine habitats can be divided into coastal and open ocean habitats. Coastal habitats are found in the area that extends from the shoreline to the edge of the continental shelf. Most marine life is found in coastal habitats, even though the shelf area occupies only seven percent of the total ocean area. Open ocean habitats are found in the deep ocean beyond the edge of the continental shelf. Alternatively, marine habitats can be divided into pelagic and demersal habitats. Pelagic habitats are found near the surface or in the open water column, away from the bottom of the ocean and affected by ocean currents, while demersal habitats are near or on the bottom. Marine habitats can be modified by their inhabitants. Some marine organisms, like corals, kelp and sea grasses, are ecosystem engineers which reshape the marine environment to the point where they create further habitat for other organisms.

Intertidal and near shore

Intertidal zones, the areas that are close to the shore, are constantly being exposed and covered by the ocean's tides. A huge array of life can be found within this zone. Shore habitats span from the upper intertidal zones to the area where land vegetation takes prominence. It can be underwater anywhere from daily to very infrequently. Many species here are scavengers, living off of sea life that is washed up on the shore. Many land animals also make much use of the shore and intertidal habitats. A subgroup of organisms in this habitat bores and grinds exposed rock through the process of bioerosion.

Estuaries

Estuaries are also near shore and influenced by the tides. An estuary is a partially enclosed coastal body of water with one or more rivers or streams flowing into it and with a free connection to the open sea. Estuaries form a transition zone between freshwater river environments and saltwater maritime environments. They are subject both to marine influences—such as tides, waves, and the influx of saline water—and to riverine influences—such as flows of fresh water and sediment. The shifting flows of both sea water and fresh water provide high levels of nutrients both in the water column and in sediment, making estuaries among the most productive natural habitats in the world.

Reefs 

Reefs comprise some of the densest and most diverse habitats in the world. The best-known types of reefs are tropical coral reefs which exist in most tropical waters; however, reefs can also exist in cold water. Reefs are built up by corals and other calcium-depositing animals, usually on top of a rocky outcrop on the ocean floor. Reefs can also grow on other surfaces, which has made it possible to create artificial reefs. Coral reefs also support a huge community of life, including the corals themselves, their symbiotic zooxanthellae, tropical fish and many other organisms.

Much attention in marine biology is focused on coral reefs and the El Niño weather phenomenon. In 1998, coral reefs experienced the most severe mass bleaching events on record, when vast expanses of reefs across the world died because sea surface temperatures rose well above normal. Some reefs are recovering, but scientists say that between 50% and 70% of the world's coral reefs are now endangered and predict that global warming could exacerbate this trend.

Open ocean

The open ocean is relatively unproductive because of a lack of nutrients, yet because it is so vast, in total it produces the most primary productivity. The open ocean is separated into different zones, and the different zones each have different ecologies. Zones which vary according to their depth include the epipelagic, mesopelagic, bathypelagic, abyssopelagic, and hadopelagic zones. Zones which vary by the amount of light they receive include the photic and aphotic zones. Much of the aphotic zone's energy is supplied by the open ocean in the form of detritus.

Deep sea and trenches 

At such depths, water pressure is extreme and there is no sunlight, but some life still exists. A white flatfish, a shrimp and a jellyfish were seen by the American crew of the bathyscaphe Trieste when it dove to the bottom in 1960. In general, the deep sea is considered to start at the aphotic zone, the point where sunlight loses its power of transference through the water. Many life forms that live at these depths have the ability to create their own light known as bio-luminescence. Marine life also flourishes around seamounts that rise from the depths, where fish and other sea life congregate to spawn and feed. Hydrothermal vents along the mid-ocean ridge spreading centers act as oases, as do their opposites, cold seeps. Such places support unique biomes and many new microbes and other lifeforms have been discovered at these locations.

Marine life 

In biology many phyla, families and genera have some species that live in the sea and others that live on land. Marine biology classifies species based on the environment rather than on taxonomy. For this reason marine biology encompasses not only organisms that live only in a marine environment, but also other organisms whose lives revolve around the sea.

Microscopic life 

As inhabitants of the largest environment on Earth, microbial marine systems drive changes in every global system.  Microbes are responsible for virtually all the photosynthesis that occurs in the ocean, as well as the cycling of carbon, nitrogen, phosphorus and other nutrients and trace elements.

Microscopic life undersea is incredibly diverse and still poorly understood. For example, the role of viruses in marine ecosystems is barely being explored even in the beginning of the 21st century.

The role of phytoplankton is better understood due to their critical position as the most numerous primary producers on Earth. Phytoplankton are categorized into cyanobacteria (also called blue-green algae/bacteria), various types of algae (red, green, brown, and yellow-green), diatoms, dinoflagellates, euglenoids, coccolithophorids, cryptomonads, chrysophytes, chlorophytes, prasinophytes, and silicoflagellates.

Zooplankton tend to be somewhat larger, and not all are microscopic. Many Protozoa are zooplankton, including dinoflagellates, zooflagellates, foraminiferans, and radiolarians. Some of these (such as dinoflagellates) are also phytoplankton; the distinction between plants and animals often breaks down in very small organisms. Other zooplankton include cnidarians, ctenophores, chaetognaths, molluscs, arthropods, urochordates, and annelids such as polychaetes. Many larger animals begin their life as zooplankton before they become large enough to take their familiar forms. Two examples are fish larvae and sea stars (also called starfish).

Plants and algae 

Microscopic algae and plants provide important habitats for life, sometimes acting as hiding places for larval forms of larger fish and foraging places for invertebrates.

Algal life is widespread and very diverse under the ocean. Microscopic photosynthetic algae contribute a larger proportion of the world's photosynthetic output than all the terrestrial forests combined. Most of the niche occupied by sub plants on land is actually occupied by macroscopic algae in the ocean, such as Sargassum and kelp, which are commonly known as seaweeds that create kelp forests.

Plants that survive in the sea are often found in shallow waters, such as the seagrasses (examples of which are eelgrass, Zostera, and turtle grass, Thalassia). These plants have adapted to the high salinity of the ocean environment. The intertidal zone is also a good place to find plant life in the sea, where mangroves or cordgrass or beach grass might grow.

Invertebrates

As on land, invertebrates make up a huge portion of all life in the sea. Invertebrate sea life includes Cnidaria such as jellyfish and sea anemones; Ctenophora; sea worms including the phyla Platyhelminthes, Nemertea, Annelida, Sipuncula, Echiura, Chaetognatha, and Phoronida; Mollusca including shellfish, squid, octopus; Arthropoda including Chelicerata and Crustacea; Porifera; Bryozoa; Echinodermata including starfish; and Urochordata including sea squirts or tunicates. Invertebrates have no backbone. There are over a million species.

Fungi 

Over 10,000 species of fungi are known from marine environments. These are parasitic on marine algae or animals, or are saprobes on algae, corals, protozoan cysts, sea grasses, wood and other substrata, and can also be found in sea foam. Spores of many species have special appendages which facilitate attachment to the substratum. A very diverse range of unusual secondary metabolites is produced by marine fungi.

Vertebrates

Fish 

A reported 33,400 species of fish, including bony and cartilaginous fish, had been described by 2016, more than all other vertebrates combined. About 60% of fish species live in saltwater.

Reptiles 

Reptiles which inhabit or frequent the sea include sea turtles, sea snakes, terrapins, the marine iguana, and the saltwater crocodile. Most extant marine reptiles, except for some sea snakes, are oviparous and need to return to land to lay their eggs. Thus most species, excepting sea turtles, spend most of their lives on or near land rather than in the ocean. Despite their marine adaptations, most sea snakes prefer shallow waters nearby land, around islands, especially waters that are somewhat sheltered, as well as near estuaries. Some extinct marine reptiles, such as ichthyosaurs, evolved to be viviparous and had no requirement to return to land.

Birds 

Birds adapted to living in the marine environment are often called seabirds. Examples include albatross, penguins, gannets, and auks. Although they spend most of their lives in the ocean, species such as gulls can often be found thousands of miles inland.

Mammals 

There are five main types of marine mammals, namely cetaceans (toothed whales and baleen whales); sirenians such as manatees;  pinnipeds including seals and the walrus; sea otters; and the 
polar bear. All are air-breathing, and while some such as the sperm whale can dive for prolonged periods, all must return to the surface to breathe.

Subfields 
The marine ecosystem is large, and thus there are many sub-fields of marine biology. Most involve studying specializations of particular animal groups, such as phycology, invertebrate zoology and ichthyology. Other subfields study the physical effects of continual immersion in sea water and the ocean in general, adaptation to a salty environment, and the effects of changing various oceanic properties on marine life. A subfield of marine biology studies the relationships between oceans and ocean life, and global warming and environmental issues (such as carbon dioxide displacement). Recent marine biotechnology has focused largely on marine biomolecules, especially proteins, that may have uses in medicine or engineering. Marine environments are the home to many exotic biological materials that may inspire biomimetic materials.

Related fields 
Marine biology is a branch of biology. It is closely linked to oceanography, especially biological oceanography, and may be regarded as a sub-field of marine science. It also encompasses many ideas from ecology. Fisheries science and marine conservation can be considered partial offshoots of marine biology (as well as environmental studies). Marine Chemistry, Physical oceanography and Atmospheric sciences are closely related to this field.

Distribution factors
An active research topic in marine biology is to discover and map the life cycles of various species and where they spend their time. Technologies that aid in this discovery include pop-up satellite archival tags, acoustic tags, and a variety of other data loggers. Marine biologists study how the ocean currents, tides and many other oceanic factors affect ocean life forms, including their growth, distribution and well-being. This has only recently become technically feasible with advances in GPS and newer underwater visual devices.

Most ocean life breeds in specific places, nests or not in others, spends time as juveniles in still others, and in maturity in yet others. Scientists know little about where many species spend different parts of their life cycles especially in the infant and juvenile years. For example, it is still largely unknown where juvenile sea turtles and some year-1 sharks travel. Recent advances in underwater tracking devices are illuminating what we know about marine organisms that live at great Ocean depths. The information that pop-up satellite archival tags give aids in certain time of the year fishing closures and development of a marine protected area. This data is important to both scientists and fishermen because they are discovering that by restricting commercial fishing in one small area they can have a large impact in maintaining a healthy fish population in a much larger area.

History 

The study of marine biology dates back to Aristotle (384–322 BC), who made many observations of life in the sea around Lesbos, laying the foundation for many future discoveries. In 1768, Samuel Gottlieb Gmelin (1744–1774) published the Historia Fucorum, the first work dedicated to marine algae and the first book on marine biology to use the new binomial nomenclature of Linnaeus. It included elaborate illustrations of seaweed and marine algae on folded leaves. The British naturalist Edward Forbes (1815–1854) is generally regarded as the founder of the science of marine biology. The pace of oceanographic and marine biology studies quickly accelerated during the course of the 19th century.

The observations made in the first studies of marine biology fueled the age of discovery and exploration that followed. During this time, a vast amount of knowledge was gained about the life that exists in the oceans of the world. Many voyages contributed significantly to this pool of knowledge. Among the most significant were the voyages of  where Charles Darwin came up with his theories of evolution and on the formation of coral reefs. Another important expedition was undertaken by HMS Challenger, where findings were made of unexpectedly high species diversity among fauna stimulating much theorizing by population ecologists on how such varieties of life could be maintained in what was thought to be such a hostile environment. This era was important for the history of marine biology but naturalists were still limited in their studies because they lacked technology that would allow them to adequately examine species that lived in deep parts of the oceans.

The creation of marine laboratories was important because it allowed marine biologists to conduct research and process their specimens from expeditions. The oldest marine laboratory in the world, Station biologique de Roscoff, was established in Concarneau, France founded by the College of France in 1859. In the United States, the Scripps Institution of Oceanography dates back to 1903, while the prominent Woods Hole Oceanographic Institute was founded in 1930. The development of technology such as sound navigation ranging, scuba diving gear, submersibles and remotely operated vehicles allowed marine biologists to discover and explore life in deep oceans that was once thought to not exist.

See also 

 Acoustic ecology
 Aquaculture
 Bathymetry
 Biological oceanography
Effects of climate change on oceans
 Freshwater biology
 Modular ocean model
 Oceanic basin
 Oceanic climate
 Phycology

Lists 

 Glossary of ecology
 Index of biology articles
 Large marine ecosystem
 List of ecologists
 List of marine biologists
 List of marine ecoregions (WWF)
 Outline of biology
 Outline of ecology

References

Further references 
 Morrissey J and Sumich J (2011) Introduction to the Biology of Marine Life Jones & Bartlett Publishers. .
 Mladenov, Philip V., Marine Biology: A Very Short Introduction, 2nd edn (Oxford, 2020; online edn, Very Short Introductions online, Feb. 2020), http://dx.doi.org/10.1093/actrade/9780198841715.001.0001, accessed 21 Jun. 2020.

External links 

 Smithsonian Ocean Portal
 Marine Conservation Society
 
 Marine Ecology - an evolutionary perspective
 Free special issue: Marine Biology in Time and Space
 Creatures of the deep ocean – National Geographic documentary, 2010.
 Exploris
 Freshwater and Marine Image Bank - From the University of Washington Library
 Marine Training Portal - Portal grouping training initiatives in the field of Marine Biology

 
Biological oceanography
Fisheries science
Oceanographical terminology